Arabsat-5A is a Saudi Arabian communications satellite operated by Arabsat. It will be used to provide television, internet and telephone services to Arabia, Africa and Europe.

History
Arabsat-5A was constructed by Astrium, and is based on the Eurostar-3000 satellite bus. Its solar arrays are expected to generate around 12 kilowatts of power at the beginning of the satellite's design life, and around 11 kilowatts at the end of it.

Arabsat-5A was launched by Arianespace using an Ariane 5ECA carrier rocket lifting off from ELA-3 at the Guiana Space Centre in Kourou, French Guiana.  The first attempt to launch it occurred on 23 June 2010, however the launch was scrubbed due to a problem with one of the rocket's subsystems. A subsequent attempt on 24 June was also scrubbed, due to a problem with the pressurisation of the rocket's fuel tanks. The launch occurred at 21:41 UTC on 26 June 2010. The South Korean COMS-1 satellite was launched by the same rocket, with a SYLDA adaptor being used to separate the spacecraft. Arabsat-5A was mounted atop the SYLDA, with COMS-1 underneath it.

Following launch, Arabsat-5A separated into a geosynchronous transfer orbit. It then use an apogee motor to raise itself into geostationary orbit. Once it reached geostationary orbit, it underwent testing before beginning operations at a longitude of 30.5 degrees East, where it replaced Arabsat-2B. It is expected to operate for fifteen years.

References

External links

IMS Official provider's site

Spacecraft launched in 2010
Communications satellites in geostationary orbit
Ariane commercial payloads
Satellites of Saudi Arabia
2010 in Saudi Arabia